The 2006 Ulster Senior Club Football Championship  was the 2006 installment of the annual Ulster Senior Club Football Championship ran by the Ulster GAA. St. Gall's of Antrim were the defending champions, but they were knocked out of their own county championship by Cargin, who went on to win Antrim. The winners, Crossmaglen Rangers, were awarded the Séamus McFerran Cup after beating Ballinderry Shamrocks in the final and went on to represent Ulster in the All-Ireland Senior Club Football Championship.

Preliminary round

Quarter-finals

Semi-finals

Final

Last 9 Layout

References

External links
 Ulster GAA website

Ulster Senior Club Football Championship
Gaelic
Ulster Senior Club Football Championship